A referendum on the electoral system was held in Slovenia on 8 December 1996. Voters were given three options to approve or not; a compensatory system, a two-round majority system and a proportional representation system at a national level. Due to the low turnout of 37.9%, none of the proposals crossed the legal threshold and the results were invalidated. However, in 1998 the results were revisited by the Constitutional Court, who found that the two round majority system had been approved.

Results

Option A: Compensatory system
The compensatory system was proposed by the National Assembly. It would have 44 single member constituencies complemented by a list vote using proportional representation which would produce a proportional seat total.

Option B: Two-round majority system
The two-round majority system would have 88 single member constituencies. It was proposed by the Social Democratic Party of Slovenia and 43,710 voters.

Option C: Proportional representation system
Option C was proposed by 30 members of the National Assembly.

References

1996 referendums
Electoral system referendum, 1996
Electoral system referendum, 1996
Electoral reform referendums
Electoral reform in Slovenia
December 1996 events in Europe
Multiple-choice referendums